Ajit Kumar Seth (born 24 November 1951) is an Indian civil servant who was the 30th Cabinet Secretary of the Republic of India. He is a 1974 batch Indian Administrative Service (IAS) officer from Uttar Pradesh Cadre. Upon retirement from the post of Cabinet Secretary, Ajit Kumar Seth was appointed as Chairman of Public Enterprises Selection Board (PESB).

Early life and education
Seth was born in Uttar Pradesh. He earned Bachelor of Science and Master of Science in Chemistry from St. Stephen's College, Delhi and also MPhil in Life Sciences from the Jawaharlal Nehru University. He later earned a master's degree in Development Finance from the University of Birmingham.

Career
Seth served as First Secretary in the Permanent Mission of India to the United Nations at Geneva.
Earlier in the 1980s Shri Seth served in the Ministry of Commerce and he served for over 3 years as First Secretary in the Permanent Mission of India to the United Nations at Geneva, Switzerland.

While in the state in Uttar Pradesh, Shri Seth served as Principal Secretary (Rural Development), Principal Secretary (Vigilance) and Secretary (Home and Confidential) besides stints in Industries and Cooperatives Departments. He also served as Divisional Commissioner of Kumaon Division in Nainital and District Magistrate of Mainpuri and Lucknow districts.

Seth was given 6 months extension, as Cabinet Secretary, by the Appointments Committee of the Cabinet, headed by Prime Minister Narendra Modi on 5 December 2014.

References

External links
 Ajit Seth is next Cabinet Secretary

1951 births
Living people
People from Uttar Pradesh
St. Stephen's College, Delhi alumni
Jawaharlal Nehru University alumni
Alumni of the University of Birmingham
Cabinet Secretaries of India
Indian Administrative Service officers